Old Hundred is an unincorporated community and census-designated place (CDP) in Scotland County, North Carolina, United States. Its population was 287 as of the 2010 census. Old Hundred has the lowest per capita income ($5,846) of any CDP in North Carolina.

History 
Old Hundred was originally calculated to be the 100-mile-marker point along the Wilmington, Charlotte and Rutherford Railroad, traveling west of Wilmington. The calculation was inaccurate and later corrected, but the name remained. The longest straight stretch of railroad track in the United States, spanning 78.86 miles, connects Old Hundred and Wilmington.

Geography
U.S. Route 74 passes through the community.

Demographics

References

Works cited 
 
 

Unincorporated communities in Scotland County, North Carolina
Unincorporated communities in North Carolina
Census-designated places in Scotland County, North Carolina
Census-designated places in North Carolina